Maxwell Shaw (21 February 1929 - 21 August 1985 in London, England) was an actor, known for The Barber of Stamford Hill (1962), Once More, with Feeling! (1960) and BBC Sunday-Night Theatre (1950). He is best remembered for his television work, but he also appeared in many feature films of the 1950s, 1960s, and early 1970s. He appeared as Mark 'Frisky' Lee in Gideon's Way (episode "Big Fish, Little Fish") (1964).

His Broadway credits include The Hostage. He had a small role in Ben-Hur (1959).

He was married to casting director Rose Tobias Shaw.

Partial filmography 
 1956 David Copperfield - Uriah Heep
 1958 No Time to Die - the Sheikh
 1959 Ben-Hur - Galley slave
 
 1960 Once More, with Feeling! - Jascha Gendel / Grisha Gendel
 1962 Dr. No - communications operator (uncredited)
 1962 The Barber of Stamford Hill - Dober
 1962 In Search of the Castaways - sailor
 1964 The Saint: The Imprudent Politician - Spencer Vallance
 1968 Nicholas Nickleby - Mr. Mantalini
 1969 The Oblong Box - Hackett
 1970-71 UFO - Dr. Schroeder
 1974  Father Brown: The Quick One - Ashley
 1974  Special Branch: Intercept - Hodges
 1975  Mister Quilp - Isaac List
 1976  The Incredible Sarah - Fadinard
 1976  The Sweeney: Sweet Smell of Succession - Colin Raleigh

References

External links 

 
 Maxwell Shaw on the Internet Broadway Database

1929 births
1985 deaths
British actors
British stage actors
British television actors
British film actors